Homaloceras is an extinct nautiloid cephalopod from the Middle Devonian with a strongly curved shell, included in the nautilid family Centroceratidae.

Homaloceras is characterized by a smooth, exogastrically curved and laterally compressed, cyrtoconic to gyroconic, shell with the ventral margin the outer rim. The venter is narrow and concave with a groove running down the middle; the dorsum on the inner rim, rounded; the sides broadly convex and convergent. The suture is only slightly sinuous, the siphuncle tubular and near the venter. ( 1964)

Homaloceras, named by Whiteavus in 1891, and found in North America, in Canada, is the most primitive and one of the earliest genera assigned to the Centroceratidae. ( 1964)

The Nautiloidea, in which Homaloceras is included, is a subclass of once diverse and numerous shelled cephalopods characterized by a retrochoantic siphuncle in which the septal necks point back toward the apex.

See also

List of nautiloids

References
 , B. 1984; Nautiloidea -Nautilida; Treatise on Invertebrate Paleontology Part K, Geological Society of America and University of Kansas Press.
 Sepkoski, J.J. Jr. 2002. A compendium of fossil marine animal genera. D.J. Jablonski & M.L. Foote (eds.). Bulletins of American Paleontology 363: 1–560. Sepkoski's Online Genus Database (CEPHALOPODA)

Nautiloids